Tønjum is a village in Lærdal Municipality in Vestland county, Norway. The eastern end of the Lærdal Tunnel (part of the European route E16 highway) is located just north of Tønjum. The highway leaves the tunnel and heads south through Tønjum, past Tønjum Church, and then east towards the village of Borgund and the Filefjell mountains.

The village is primarily a farming village with assorted vegetable production as their main occupation. In recent years, the growing of cherries has become more prevalent.

References 

Villages in Vestland
Lærdal